Enoch Adu  (born 17 September 1998), commonly called Adu , is a Ghanaian professional footballer who plays as midfielder for Nyköpings BIS in the Swedish Division 1 Norra league.

Early life
Adu, began his football career with a colts team in Kumasi, Ghana, and was scouted by Right to Dream Academy in the 2009 Milo tournament (A football tournament in Ghana for only basic school children). Adu was award a scholarship at the Right to Dream Academy in Ghana to study and also play football. He graduated from the academy in 2015 as one of the best players in his generation. While at the academy, he had trials with English Premier League team Manchester City FC. Adu also traveled to Denish side FC Nordsjælland for trials with teammate Abdul Mumin, Vejle football club in Denmark, and SC Braga in Portugal.

Club career

Inter Allies
Adu made his professional debut for Ghana Premier League team Inter Allies FC on 26 June 2016, in a 1–0 win against Sekondi Hasaccas where he came off the bench in the 55th minute after signing a loan deal with Inter Allies which expired after the 2015-2016 Ghana Premier League season. On 27 July 2016, Adu scored his debut goal for Inter Allies in a 2–0 against Wa All Stars in a Ghana Premier League game at the Tema Sports Stadium.

Östers IF
Adu joined Swedish Superettan team Östers IF on a two-year deal as midfielder after a successful trial in April 2017. On Monday 17 April 2017, Adu marked his debut game for Östers as they won 1–0 against Frej, he played for 58 minutes. Adu has featured in eight Superettan games for Östers. On 30 May, Adu scored his first hat trick in a professional career for Östers as they beat Bors SK 12–0 in the Swedish Hyundai Cup.

International career
Adu was part of the Ghana U17 team that won the four nations tournament in Namibia in April 2014. He was also an integral member of the Ghana U17 squad team that was disqualified after qualifying for the 2015 AYC in Niger.

He was also part of the Ghana U-20 team that were not able to qualify for the 2017 African U-20 Championship in Zambia.

Career statistics

Club

Notes

References

External links

1998 births
Living people
Ghanaian footballers
Association football midfielders
International Allies F.C. players
Östers IF players
FK Karlskrona players
Nyköpings BIS players
Ghanaian expatriate footballers
Ghanaian expatriate sportspeople in Sweden
Expatriate footballers in Sweden